William Harrison Dimmick (December 20, 1815 – August 2, 1861) was an American politician from Pennsylvania who served as a Democratic member of the U.S. House of Representatives for Pennsylvania's 13th congressional district from 1857 to 1861.

Biography
William H. Dimmick (brother of Milo Melankthon Dimmick) was born in Milford, Pennsylvania, the son of Dan Dimmick, a lawyer and Jane, daughter of Jacobus Josephus Aerts, also known as Dr. Francis J. Smith.  He studied law, was admitted to the bar in 1835 and commenced practice in Bethany, Pennsylvania.  He moved to Honesdale, Pennsylvania, in 1842 and continued the practice of law.  He served as prosecuting attorney of Wayne County, Pennsylvania, in 1836 and 1837.  He was a member of the Pennsylvania State Senate for the 10th district from 1845 to 1846.

Dimmick was elected as a Democrat to the Thirty-fifth and Thirty-sixth Congresses.  He resumed the practice of law and died in Honesdale in 1861.  Interment in Glen Dyberry Cemetery.

Dimmick's law partner was his younger cousin Samuel E. Dimmick, whom he trained in law.  The two cousins ran as opponents in the 1856 election.

Notes

Sources

The Political Graveyard
Another bio

|-

1815 births
1861 deaths
19th-century American politicians
Burials in Pennsylvania
Democratic Party members of the United States House of Representatives from Pennsylvania
Pennsylvania lawyers
Democratic Party Pennsylvania state senators
People from Milford, Pennsylvania
19th-century American lawyers